Duško Tošić (born 19 January 1985) is a Serbian former professional footballer who played as a defender.

Club career

Early career
Born in Zrenjanin, Tošić began his career in his native Serbia playing for OFK Beograd before moving to French club Sochaux in the winter of 2006 but only spent one and a half seasons with the club as other European clubs from Italy, Germany and Spain were expressing an interest. During his time at Sochaux, they won the 2006–07 Coupe de France.

Werder Bremen
He transferred to Werder Bremen for the 2007–08 season, where he signed a contract until 2011. On 1 February 2010, his contract with Bremen was dissolved.

Portsmouth
Tošić signed for Portsmouth on 12 February 2010, but as a result of Portsmouth's financial situation Tošić's registration with the Premier League was withheld and he was forced to leave the club within a month of signing for them. Tošić was an unused substitute in Portsmouth's 4–1 FA Cup fifth-round win at Southampton in February, and failed to get on the pitch that season. He signed a loan deal to play for QPR until the end of the season on 25 March 2010.

Red Star Belgrade
On 7 July 2010, he joined Red Star Belgrade, signing a three-year contract, rejecting the interest of some English clubs. On 31 August 2011, it was announced he would join Real Betis on a two-year loan with an option of Betis buying the player afterwards. He returned to Red Star in January 2012.

Gençlerbirliği
On 21 June 2012, it was announced that Tošić will leave Red Star Belgrade and join Turkish Süper Lig side Gençlerbirliği. He played for three seasons there and was one of the best players in the team.

Beşiktaş
On 2 June 2015, Tošić signed a three-year contract for Beşiktaş. Beşiktaş won the title in the Süper Lig in 2015–16, as well as in 2016–17, with Tošić mainly occupying the left central defender position.

Guangzhou R&F
On 18 May 2018, Beşiktaş have announced that Tošić  is set to sign for Guangzhou R&F, with a €5 million fee mooted. He signed two and a half year long contract worth €5.8 million per season.

International career
Tošić made his national debut against Norway on 15 November 2006, a friendly which ended in a 1–1 draw.

In June 2018, Serbia manager Mladen Krstajić included Tošić in the final 23-man squad for the 2018 World Cup. There he appeared in two matches, against Costa Rica and Switzerland.

Personal life
Born in Zrenjanin, Tošić grew up in a small village called Orlovat which is located nearby. He married Serbian pop singer Jelena Karleuša in June 2008 and they have two daughters Atina and Nika. They have divorced in July 2022.

Career statistics

Club

International

Scores and results list Serbia's goal tally first, score column indicates score after each Tošić goal.

Honours
Sochaux
 Coupe de France: 2006–07

Werder Bremen
 DFB-Pokal: 2008–09
 UEFA Cup Runner-up: 2008–09

Red Star Belgrade
 Serbian Cup: 2011–12

Beşiktaş
Süper Lig: 2015–16, 2016–17

Serbia
 UEFA Under-21 Championship: runner-up 2007

Individual
 UEFA European Under-21 Championship Team of the Tournament: 2007
 Serbian SuperLiga Team of the Season: 2010–11, 2011–12

References

External links

1985 births
Living people
Sportspeople from Zrenjanin
Serbian footballers
Association football defenders
Serbia international footballers
Serbia under-21 international footballers
Serbia and Montenegro under-21 international footballers
Olympic footballers of Serbia
Footballers at the 2008 Summer Olympics
2018 FIFA World Cup players
Serbian SuperLiga players
Ligue 1 players
Bundesliga players
English Football League players
La Liga players
Süper Lig players
Chinese Super League players
OFK Beograd players
Red Star Belgrade footballers
FC Sochaux-Montbéliard players
SV Werder Bremen players
Portsmouth F.C. players
Queens Park Rangers F.C. players
Real Betis players
Gençlerbirliği S.K. footballers
Beşiktaş J.K. footballers
Guangzhou City F.C. players
Kasımpaşa S.K. footballers
Serbian expatriate footballers
Expatriate footballers in France
Expatriate footballers in Germany
Expatriate footballers in England
Expatriate footballers in Spain
Expatriate footballers in Turkey
Expatriate footballers in China
Serbian expatriate sportspeople in France
Serbian expatriate sportspeople in Germany
Serbian expatriate sportspeople in England
Serbian expatriate sportspeople in Spain
Serbian expatriate sportspeople in Turkey
Serbian expatriate sportspeople in China